Wileyfox is a British smartphone manufacturer founded in 2015. It went into administration on 6 February 2018. On 19 March 2018 it was announced that Santok Group had agreed a licensing deal covering sales of handsets in Europe and South Africa.

The firm aimed to provide products that were more affordable than their competitors, whilst not compromising on quality. The company claims that by having a smaller workforce and with no legacy devices to support, they were able to sell their  devices for lower prices. Wileyfox stated that the commoditisation of hardware will enable them to differentiate its products from competitors using other Android derivates or iOS.

Products
This article states the actual device specifications, which may differ from specification sheets provided by Wileyfox.

1st generation: Swift, Storm 
These devices were announced in August 2015, originally running Cyanogen OS 12.1, with sales and shipments starting later that year. Both devices have dual SIM capability. The Swift is codenamed crackling, whereas the codename of Storm is kipper. Devices offer a non-stereo speaker.

Specification overview

Swift 
The Wileyfox Swift design is similar to the Qualcomm Seed reference design and by extension many rebadging designs, like the Longcheer L8150. This makes it comparable to 2nd generation Android One devices. Video recording in 1080p is supported at up to 30fps; 720p recording is supported at up to 60fps. The rear camera sensor is a Samsung S5K3M2 chip with Isocell pixels, which provide better image quality when compared to BSI pixels. The device supports GPS and GLONASS satellite positioning. Two colour variants, sandstone black and white, are produced; however, availability varies by country. At its time of release, the Swift was the cheapest Cyanogen OS device available in Western Europe. Although not initially available, as of late 2016 replacement batteries are now sold by the manufacturer on their website.

The device was well received by the public and media, however, comments have been made about the micro-USB port being too recessed (preventing many third-party cables from properly locking in the port). The plug shaft length of cables supplied by Wileyfox exceeds the minimum length mandated by the USB specification by approximately 0,5mm. Wileyfox's cables do not meet USB specification requirements in other aspects, and as of 2016-01-15, Wileyfox did not pass the compliance requirements to use USB logos or trademarks. Because the metal ring holding the rear camera lens has sharp edges, moving the device on a comparatively soft surface, such as a wooden table, easily leaves scratch marks. The accessory clip-on covers available from Wileyfox alleviate this issue by protruding beyond the metal ring, and are offered in black and red orange. While these cases protect the back, rear camera lens and sides, they do not protrude to protect the screen. The device dimensions change to 73mm width, 143mm height, and 10mm thickness. GPS and GLONASS performance is fast and accurate, for early production dates. However, a metallic adhesive layer on the inside of the back cover was added in later production batches, for a purpose not known to the public. For phones produced with this layer GPS and GLONASS reception can be poor, unless it is manually peeled off.

In addition to the officially supported, proprietary firmware Cyanogen OS, its basis, the Android derivative CyanogenMod, supports the device. The first release for the Swift is version 13.0, which was made available on 2016-03-16, simultaneously with the first wave of CyanogenMod 13 releases. As of 2020, the device is still supported by LineageOS, with LineageOS 17.1 allowing Android 10 to run on the device. In February 2022, LineageOS support ended.

Storm 
The Wileyfox Storm is a 5.5-inch FHD smartphone based around a unibody design. Like the Swift, the Storm uses a 2500mAh battery, but the unibody construction makes the battery non-removable. A side-mounted slot accessed by a pinhole reveals a tray that allows a combination of a Micro and Nano SIM card or a MicroSD card and a Micro SIM card. The front facing camera is 8MP and benefits from a LED flash for selfies. The rear camera is a 20 MP Sony EXMOR IMX220 sensor capable of 1080p and 90 fps slow-motion capture. The device supports GPS and GLONASS satellite positioning. Two colour variants, sandstone black and white, are produced; however, availability varies by country.

2nd generation: Spark, Spark +, Spark X 
In June 2016, a new range of phones was announced, consisting of Spark, Spark + and Spark X, which use Mediatek MT6735 SoCs and provide dual SIM capability. The device codenames are porridge for Spark and Spark + and porridgek3 for Spark X.

Specification overview

3rd generation: Swift 2, Swift 2 Plus, Swift 2 X 
In November 2016, a new range of phones were announced: Swift 2, Swift 2 Plus and Swift 2 X. The devices use Qualcomm SoCs again, specifically the MSM8937 octa-core clocked at 1.4 GHz, paired with an Adreno 505 GPU.

All third-generation phones support Qualcomm's Quick Charge 3.0 standard, although no charger is included in the box. The devices are codenamed marmite.

The device codenamed champagne seems to be marmite devices with the back of the phone coloured gold.

Specification overview 

Wileyfox runout model came installed with Android Oreo 8.1, 3Gb RAM, and 32Gb internal memory
However, it also has an inherent fault with the front facing 'Selfie' camera. The fault manifests itself by when it is initially activated, the exposure is correct, but after a second or two, the screen goes dark as if night has quickly fallen. This has been acknowledged by Wileyfox who stated that they were working on a software fix to address the issue. As of September 2020, no fix has been released.

Accessories 
The firm also produced spare batteries, clip-on covers, and screen protectors specific to their phones.

References

External links 
 

Electronics companies of the United Kingdom
Mobile phone manufacturers
British brands